Did You Hear About the Morgans? is a 2009 American romantic comedy thriller film directed and written by Marc Lawrence. Hugh Grant and Sarah Jessica Parker portray the film's protagonists, Paul and Meryl Morgan, a recently separated New York City power couple on the verge of divorce until they witness the murder of Meryl's client. They are forced to enter into temporary witness protection, given new identities, and relocated to a small Wyoming town (the fictional Ray, Wyoming, 45 minutes out of Cody). Supporting roles are played by Sam Elliott, Mary Steenburgen, Elisabeth Moss, and Wilford Brimley. It is the second collaboration of Grant and Parker, following the 1996 film Extreme Measures.

The film premiered in New York on December 14, 2009, and in London the following day. It was released to the United States on December 18 and to most of Europe in January 2010. It received generally negative reviews from critics. The film grossed $6,616,571 in its opening weekend and earned $85 million worldwide.

Plot
A successful Manhattan couple, lawyer Paul Morgan (Hugh Grant) and estate agent Meryl Morgan (Sarah Jessica Parker) are separated due to Paul's infidelity. After dinner one night, Meryl and Paul witness the murder of one of Meryl's real estate clients. As a result, they become targets of contract killer Vincent (Michael Kelly) and must enter the Witness Protection Program.

Paul and Meryl are relocated to the small town of Ray, Wyoming, and placed temporarily under the protection of husband and wife/sheriff and deputy Clay and Emma Wheeler (Sam Elliott and Mary Steenburgen). For their own safety, they are permitted no outside contact by telephone or e-mail. They have trouble adjusting to small-town life, but after a perilous encounter with a bear and awkward attempts at shooting rifles, chopping wood, and horseback riding, they eventually adjust and begin assisting the local citizens professionally. Meanwhile, neither of their assistants back in New York City know their whereabouts. Meryl secretly calls the adoption agency she's been trying to adopt through to let them know she won't be able to go through with the adoption. Vincent plants a bug at Meryl's office and in her assistant Jackie's (Elisabeth Moss) purse, hoping to gain information, which is eventually successful when Jackie hears from the adoption agency that Meryl called and what number she used.

Jackie attempts to call Meryl but Paul's assistant Adam (Jesse Liebman) stops her by kissing her, which she responds to by tasering him and then apologizing, and suggesting that he take her on a date the next day. Paul and Meryl go on a "date" in town and begin to reconcile, discussing the stress of infertility that led to their relationship deteriorating and Paul's subsequent infidelity. They get back together, but then Paul is heartbroken when he learns that Meryl had a one-night stand with one of their acquaintances during their separation. The next day, with Vincent in town unbeknownst to them, the Morgans anticipate leaving Ray for a permanent hiding place. The Wheelers invite them to a rodeo, but the Morgans are at loggerheads, so they decline. Leaving the Morgans without any form of security, the Wheelers leave for the rodeo. Vincent tries to attack the house but is accosted by a bear, which gives the Morgans time to escape. They flee on horseback to the rodeo to seek help. Vincent follows them to the rodeo where they spot him and hide in a bull suit. However, they end up in the ring with a bull, which then charges them, injuring Meryl. Meryl, unable to walk, stays hidden from Vincent while Paul impulsively confronts him with a canister of bear repellent spray. Paul accidentally sprays himself in the face, alerting Vincent who then holds Paul at gun-point. The Morgans are rescued by the Wheelers and their new friends from the town.

Six months later, Jackie and Adam are in a committed relationship while Paul and Meryl have repaired their marriage. They have an adopted baby girl from China, named Rae in honor of the Wyoming town, and Meryl is pregnant with their biological child living happily together in New York City.

Cast
 Hugh Grant as Paul Morgan
 Sarah Jessica Parker as Meryl Morgan
 Sam Elliott as Clay Wheeler
 Mary Steenburgen as Emma Wheeler
 Elisabeth Moss as Jackie Drake
 Michael Kelly as Vincent
 Wilford Brimley as Earl Granger
 Seth Gilliam as U.S. Marshal Lasky
 Jesse Liebman as Adam Feller
 Kim Shaw as Nurse Kelly
 Gracie Bea Lawrence as Lucy Granger
 Christopher Atwood as Rodeo
 David Call as Doc D. Simmons
 Kevin Brown as U.S. Marshall Henderson	
 Steven Boyer as U.S. Marshall Ferber
 Bart the Bear 2 as Bear

Production
Filming for Did You Hear About the Morgans took place over 25 days in May and June in 2009. The film was shot in New York City; Santa Fe, New Mexico; and Roy, New Mexico. Bart the Bear 2 was trained by professional employees of Heber City, Utah's Wasatch Rocky Mountain Wildlife.

Reception

Critical response
On Rotten Tomatoes the film has an approval rating of 12% based on reviews from 123 critics, with an average rating of 3.60/10. The site's consensus states "It gets a certain amount of mileage out of the inherent likability of its stars, but with an unfunny script and a lack of onscreen chemistry, Did You Hear About the Morgans? falls flat." On Metacritic the film has a weighted average score of 27 out of 100, based on 28 reviews, indicating "generally unfavorable reviews".  Audiences surveyed by CinemaScore gave the film a grade "B−" on scale of A to F.

John Anderson of Variety magazine wrote: "the charm of the film is that it resists turning people into cliches and lets Parker and Grant work their particular magic -- before they get to Wyoming, their performances are as stressed out as their characters, and while it's a dubious conceit that going cowboy is a cure-all, they put the notion across as convincingly as possible."

Box office
In its first opening weekend, the film opened at #4 in the United States box office earning $6,616,571. With a budget of $58 million, Did You Hear About the Morgans? grossed only $29.5 million domestically at the box office. It did a little better internationally, earning an additional $56 million, for a total of $85 million worldwide.

Home media
Did You Hear About the Morgans? was released on DVD and Blu-ray on March 16, 2010.

The DVD features:
 Audio commentary with director Lawrence, and stars Grant and Parker
 5 featurettes
 Deleted scenes
 Outtakes

References

External links
 
 
 
 

2009 films
2000s English-language films
American romantic comedy films
Castle Rock Entertainment films
Columbia Pictures films
Films set in Wyoming
Relativity Media films
Films directed by Marc Lawrence
Films with screenplays by Marc Lawrence
Films scored by Theodore Shapiro
Films about witness protection
2009 romantic comedy films
2000s American films